Sky Lease Cargo Inc. (legally Sky Lease I Inc) is an American cargo airline based in Miami, Florida.

History
The airline was established in 1969, as Wrangler Aviation and started operations in 1973, using Lockheed Constellation aircraft under FAA Part 91. It became a Part 121 carrier in 1978 and became an all-cargo airline in 1981.

Between 1991 and 1992, issues of citizenship, ownership, and compliance with federal airline laws resulted in the conclusion and finding that through the unregulated use of "Delaware Company Law" and the practice of subsidiaries being parts of other subsidiaries," Wrangler Aviation did not meet the fitness requirements of a certificated airline of the United States. The conclusions resulted in restructuring changes to the company to continue operating.

Tradewinds Airlines

In 1991, the airline was renamed to Tradewinds Airlines. On February 28, 1994, Tradewinds was acquired by Florida West Airlines, although it was sold off a year later. In December 2007, Donald Watkins, a lawyer from Alabama bought part of the company. On June 6, 2008, the airline reduced its staff by 70% and parked all their fleet.

During 2006, explorative attempts were made by Valiant Airways to contract Tradewinds Airlines for "start-up" operations, but these attempts failed to result in services coming to fruition.

Further press releases on June 3, 2008, indicate that Tradewinds returned five Boeing 747-200F aircraft to the lessor and furloughed employees that operated the lines. On July 25, 2008, Tradewinds Airlines filed for Chapter 11 bankruptcy protection for the third time. The company cited rising fuel costs and low demand, but plans to continue to operate flights during reorganization. In December 2008, Tradewinds Airlines was purchased by Sky Lease One, based out of Florida.

Sky Lease Cargo
Tradewinds Airlines was renamed Sky Lease Cargo on September 4, 2011, and also changed its IATA and ICAO codes. The company operates two 747-400s to various points in South America from Miami International Airport.

Destinations

As of March 2020, Sky Lease Cargo operates the following services:

Fleet

Current fleet
As of October 2020, Sky Lease Cargo's fleet includes:

Former fleet
The airline formerly operated the following aircraft:

Airbus A300B4F
Boeing 747-200F
Canadair CL-44
Lockheed Constellation
Lockheed L-1011 TriStar
McDonnell Douglas MD-11F (one involved in China Eastern Airlines Flight 583)
McDonnell Douglas MD-11CF

Incidents and accidents

On June 7, 2006, a Boeing 747-200F by the (registered N922FT) had an engine failure on takeoff at José María Córdova International Airport. The take-off was aborted, but the plane overran the runway. None of the 6 on board were injured. However, the plane was substantially damaged.
On November 7, 2018, Sky Lease Cargo Flight 4854 overran Runway 14 at Halifax Stanfield International Airport. The aircraft was written off.

See also
List of airlines of the United States

References

External links 

Airlines established in 1969
Airlines based in Florida
Cargo airlines of the United States
Companies based in Miami
Companies that filed for Chapter 11 bankruptcy in 2008
1991 establishments in North Carolina